Alpha Bank Skopje (full name: Alpha Bank AD Skopje) is the subsidiary of the Greek bank Alpha Bank in North Macedonia.

In 1999, Alpha Bank officially agreed to the purchase of a 65% stake in the Macedonian Kreditna Banka. In 2002, Alpha Bank, Athens acquired the minority stake and changed its name to Alpha Bank Skopje.

History
In April 1993, one of the first private Banks of the country was established, then named Kreditna Banka AD Skopje.

In January 2000, Alpha Bank, Athens acquired the majority stake in the Bank and became the main shareholder.

In April 2002, the Bank was renamed into Alpha Bank AD Skopje, following Alpha Bank Group worldwide policy.

In August 2002, Alpha Bank, Athens acquired the minority stake and became the sole shareholder in Alpha Bank AD Skopje, accounting for 100% of its share capital.

See also

List of banks
List of banks in North Macedonia

References

External links
Official site

Banks of North Macedonia
Banks established in 1993
Companies based in Skopje
Macedonian companies established in 1993